Märchen is the seventh story CD, released by the fantasy symphonic rock band Sound Horizon on December 15, 2010 through King Records. The normal edition debuted No. 3 and peaked No. 2 on the Oricon weekly album charts. While the Limited edition sold over 40,000 copies in the first two days, 24,816 copies on the first day, 15,833 copies on the next.

Plot
Once upon a time, there was a woman named Therese von Ludowing who lived far from society in Thüringen with her son, März von Ludowing. But, Therese's reputation for her herbal remedies resulted with her being captured by two men in plague masks to be condemned a witch—due to the Black Plague occurring at the time. Although Therese attempts to fight them off when her son unknowingly brought the men to their hut, she is captured while März is tossed into the well outside their home, and she curses the world in her final breath before her execution. The following night, his once white hair stained black - "the color of dusk" - and no memory of who he was, the reborn Märchen von Friedhof emerged from the well after being awakened by a living doll named Elise. Elise compels Märchen to aid seven "princesses" in taking revenge in seven tales to achieve their own revenge. Each tale revolves around a deadly sin.

The Witch at the Stake
The tale of gluttony begins with a mother and child living together in poverty. The husband a money loaner unable to provide for his family, while the mother and child are blamed to be witches and shunned by society. Even if abused, the child is happy to live with her mother and the animals in the forest - her only friends. But when eventually abandoned by her mother, the child was taken by a monastery where she became a nun. The monastery was taken down soon after she took her vows, and so she decided to return home to find the answer behind her mother's actions. Finding the deranged old woman her mother became, the nun offers her a piece of bread, that the old woman greedily devoured. But when the nun asks if she knew her, the old woman killed the nun out of madness for more of the bread, and crucified her daughter's body on an inverted cross. Finding his first "princess", Märchen decides to use two children to give irony to the nun's revenge on her mother.

Hansel and Gretel are the young children of a poor woodcutter who find themselves lost in the woods and find the old woman's house. Having inherited her money-loaner husband's fortune, the old woman welcomes the children and feeds them out of regret for not doing so with her own daughter. Seeing Hansel gaining weight, Gretel becomes deluded that their hostess is a wicked witch who waylays children to cook and eat them. This resulted with the children shoving the woman into her oven, leaving her to die in the flames. The two leave to brag of their good deed to their friend Tom, as the three children take the old woman's house as their own. While Märchen comments to Elise on any old woman in a forest can be a witch, the doll expresses her disdain for cruel and dishonest children.

The Dark Landlady's Inn
A tale of greed that begins with a somewhat dim country girl born in a poor farming village before it was invaded by General Gefenbauer. Like the other girls in her village who were sold away, she came to work for the aged and enigmatic landlady of the Black Fox Inn known for its famous liver dish. But what she did not know is that the landlady obtained her livers from human corpses rather than buy them to maintain her expensive lifestyle, eventually hanging the servant girl to use her liver when the number of corpses begin to run low. Expressing regret that the country girl served as an unwitting accomplice, Märchen reanimates her so she can take revenge by taking the greedy landlady's liver as compensation. Märchen and Elise discuss the flaws of the landlady's get-rich scheme.

The Princess Sleeping in the Glass Coffin
A tale of envy that begins with the birth of a baby girl whose white skin, red lips, and black hair earned her to name of Snow White by her dying mother. Snow White's father, the king, eventually took for his new wife a cold-hearted and vain woman who possesses a magical mirror that tells her that she is the most beautiful in the land. But when Snow White reached an age where her beauty overshadows her own, the jealous Queen has a huntsman take Snow White deep into the forest and kill her. But the huntsman could not bring himself to commit the deed and, taking the innards of a young boar to put the Queen's mind at rest, lets Snow White flee deep into the forest where he came under the care of seven Dwarves. But the Queen learned of the hunter's ruse, the Queen succeeds in killing Snow White with poisoned apple. Coming across the glass coffin by chance, noting she is not dead, Märchen bids the sleeping Snow White to wait for her fated love and the chance to take revenge. Time passes, and Prince Charming travels through the land before seeing Snow White in her glass coffin. Falling in love at first sight, the prince takes the coffin with the dwarves handing the body over. But when the coffin is dropped due to careless handling, Snow White immediately wakes up as the piece of poisoned apple got dislodged from her throat. As she and Charming set up their wedding, Snow White invites her stepmother to have her be punished for the attempts on her life by being forced to wear a pair of glowing iron shoes and dance in them until she drops dead.

The Old and Unused Well of the Boundary That Separates Life and Death
A tale of sloth begins with a stepdaughter who is forced to work by her stepmother and her lazy daughter after her father passes. One day, while spindling wool, the stepdaughter  pricks her finger and while washing the blood, she accidentally dropped the spindle into the well. After running home, her stepmother and daughter yelled at her to get the spindle back, so the girl, fearing retribution from her stepmother, dives into the well after it. Detecting the stepdaughter's hesitation at taking revenge, Märchen offers her more time to mull over her choices as she wanders into the other world of Mother Hulda, who awards the girl's hard work and kindness by covering her in gold. When the girl returns, the mother sends her lazy daughter down the well to work for Mother Hulda to be showered in gold as well. But the lazy daughter refuses to help in the chores her stepsister did and justly is punished by being forever covered with pitch. While Märchen considers it the cutest revenge he orchestrated, Elise amusingly calls it a fate worse than death.

The Princess Sleeping in the Tower of Roses 
A tale of pride begins with the birth of an infant girl with fairies are invited to be godmothers to the infant princess while gifting her with blesses. But one uninvited fairy, Alterose, arrives and curses the infant princess to die the moment she pricked her finger on the spindle of a spinning wheel on the day of her 15th birthday. Luckily, the last of the godmothers uses her magic to alter the curse into one of a deep sleep until awakened by a prince's kiss. Despite the king's attempt to thwart the spiteful fairy's curse, it comes to fruition years later when the princess is drawn to a room where an old woman is working on her spinning wheel and her curious nature sealed her fate. Having listen to the princess's story, Märchen assures her that her prince will come. Years later, having heard the tale of the Wild Rose Princess, a prince comes across the tower covered in roses and reaches the chamber where the Princess lies asleep on the bed. Upon being revived by the prince's kiss, the princess orders for Alterose's banishment from the kingdom. But as her final revenge, Alterose leaves the princess with a curse to abandon her children in the forest. Märchen and Elise comment that injuring a woman's pride is a dangerous thing to do.

The Blue Marquis' Castle
A tale of lust that begins with a girl who married a wealthy aristocrat whose previous wives all disappeared under mysterious circumstances. She was given free rein in the Marquis's castle save for one room that she must never enter under any circumstance. Though she promised her husband, the girl later broke her vow while he was away and found the secret room to hold the murdered corpses of the Marquis's previous wives. Her husband has found out when she discovered the murdered corpses of Marquis's previous wives and her husband told her that he killed his wives because they betrayed him. Her husband tried to kill her as she knew his crime and she screams for help. Her brother arrived and killed her husband.

The Crucified Saint
Märchen comes to a church and senses a restless spirit in the statue of Saint Solicitous, asking her to tell him her tale. Solicitous explains she was once a noblewoman named Elizabeth whose devotion to her faith was strong to the 
point of vowing before God that she would never marry anyone. Her brother, attempted to marry her off before he decided to have her crucified. Though Märchen sought to give Elizabeth a wrathful conclusion to her tale, she expresses having not intention for revenge and is only glad to see Märchen again as she reveals herself to be the childhood friend of his true self: März. With Märchen's lost memory restored, it causes his mother's enchantment to be undone as Elise to become inanimate again before Märchen carries her lifeless body away. After return to his mother's hut, Märchen realizes that his life will also fade as he ceases to be as dawn rises on the beginning of an enlightened age. Many years later, a group of children would come to the ruined remains of the hut and find the only proof that Marchen lived: A book titled Fairy Tales of Light and Darkness.

Track listing
All tracks composed and arranged and lyrics written by Revo.

Personnel

Musician

 Revo - Composition, Lyrics, Arrangement
 Nishiyama Takeshi - Guitar, Steel Guitar (#1,5,8)
 Yuki - Guitar, Classical Guitar (#1,3,4,8)
 Saitō "Jake" Shingo - Guitar, Classical Guitar (#2,6)
 Marty Friedman - Guitar, Classical Guitar (#7)
 Hasegawa Atsushi - Bass
 Igarashi Kōji - Piano, Synthesizer, Organ, Cembalo (#1,3,4,7,8)
 Kawai Eiji - Piano, Synthesizer, Organ, Cembalo, Electronic Piano (#2,6)
 Matsumoto Keiji - Piano, Synthesizer, Organ (#5,9)
 Junji - Drum (#1,8)
 Ken☆Ken - Drum (#2,6)
 Abe Tōru - Drum (#3,4)
 Abe Kaoru - Drum (#5,9)

Vocal, Voice
 REVO: Märchen von Friedhof
 Miku Hatsune (Saki Fujita): Elize
 Ayano Kanami: The Nun
 MIKI: Therese/The Old Woman/The Queen/The Stepmother/Alte-Rose
 Kiriyama Kazuki: Hansel
 Kobayashi Sayumi: Gretel
 REMI: The Country Girl
 Jimang: The Landlady/The Magic Mirror/The Huntsman
 Tomoyo Kurosawa: Snow White
 Yume Suzuki: The Prince
 Ceui: The Stepdaughter
 Azumi Inoue: Mother Hulda/Aprikose
 Chinatsu Ishii: The Stepsister
 Mikuni Shimokawa: Rose Princess
 Minami Kuribayashi: The First Wife
 Akio Otsuka: Bluebeard
 Joelle: Elisabeth

Voice
 Idolfried Ehrenberg
 Nobuo Tobita
 Miyuki Sawashiro
 Asuka Tanii
 Tōru Ōkawa
 Yuichi Nakamura
 Saki Fujita
 Sascha

Illustration
 Yokoyan

Trivia
The story of the album features fairy tale stories, exploring the darker aspects of it. Well-known fairytales such as Hänsel and Gretel, Snow White, Mother Hulda, Sleeping Beauty and Bluebeard etc. can be found in the album.

"Märchen" is German for fairytales.

The number "7" has been presented several times in the album. 7 Tragic Stories, 7 deadly sins, 7 victims, 28 bonus tracks of 7 seconds each making the album total duration of 77 minutes as well as the album designed to fold out creating "七" (Kanji for 7).

The length of the titles of the list of songs are symmetrical, creating an identical form of a church. (This excludes bonus track)

The lyric booklet is made to feel like an old book or a bible.

All the songs with tragic stories contain the identical verse, but arranged in different style representing the similarities of the stories, for instance the common theme of revenge.

References

2010 albums
Music based on fairy tales